The Henry Howland Memorial Prize at Yale was created in 1915 for a "citizen of any country in recognition of some achievement of marked distinction in the field of literature or fine arts or the science of government." The idealistic quality of the recipient's work is an important factor in his selection.

The award was established in honor of Henry Elias Howland (1835–1913), a member of the Yale class of 1854, by a donation of $15,000 by his children Charles P. Howland (Yale 1891), Dr. John Howland (Yale 1894), and Frances Howland.

Recipients 
The prize has generally been awarded every two years; the following is a partial list of recipients:
1916 - Rupert Brooke (1887–1915), soldier and poet (awarded posthumously)
1918 - Jean-Julien Lemordant (1882–1968), artist
1924 - Gustav Holst (1874–1934), composer
1925 - Robert Edmond Jones (1887–1954), scenic designer
1929 - Arthur Salter (1881–1975), diplomat involved in the League of Nations
1930 - Ragnar Ostberg (1866–1945), architect
1933 - Philip John Noel-Baker(1889–1982), politician and diplomat who later won the Nobel Peace Prize
1937 - Salvador de Madariaga (1886–1978), diplomat and historian
1939 - John Bell Condliffe (1891–1981), economist
1940 - Paul Hindemith (1895–1963), composer
1943 - Joseph C. Grew (1880-1965), diplomat
1944 - Field Marshal Sir John Dill (1881–1944), British representative on the Combined Chiefs of Staff.
1949 - Sven Markelius (1889–1972), architect
1952 - John Hersey (1914–1993), author
1954 - Ralph Vaughan Williams (1872–1958), composer
1955 - Sir Owen Dixon (1886–1972), judge and diplomat
1966 - Tyrone Guthrie (1900–1971), theatre director
1967 - Indira Gandhi (1917–1984), Prime Minister of India
1970 - Aaron Copland (1900–1990), composer
1971 - Leopold Stokowski (1882–1977), conductor
1977 - Alistair Cooke (1908–2004), journalist and broadcaster
1980 - Warren J. Haas (b. 1925), president of the Association of Research Libraries
1989 - Russell Baker (1925–2019), author
2008 - Tony Blair (b. 1953), Prime Minister of the United Kingdom
2010 - Paul Krugman (b. 1953), economist

There are other Howland Fellowships and Prizes, including the Charles P. Howland Fellowship, at Yale, established in 1947 by Frances L. Howland as a tribute to her brother Charles P. Howland, Class of 1891, and the American Pediatric Society's John Howland Medal honoring another brother, Dr. John Howland, professor of pediatrics at Johns Hopkins Medical School.

See also

 List of awards for contributions to culture

References

Awards and prizes of Yale University
Awards established in 1915
American literary awards
Governance and civic leadership awards